Myrina dermaptera, the lesser fig-tree blue or scarce fig-tree blue, is a butterfly of the family Lycaenidae. It is found in Sub-Saharan Africa, southern Arabia and northern Oman.

The wingspan is 26–32 mm for males and 30–38 mm for females. Adults are on wing year round with strong peaks in November and from April to June.

The larvae feed on Ficus species, including F. sur, F. thonningii and F. natalensis.

Subspecies
 Myrina dermaptera dermaptera (Eastern Cape to KwaZulu-Natal and Mpumalanga and Limpopo, southern Mozambique)
 Myrina dermaptera nyassae Talbot, 1935 (Zimbabwe, Malawi, eastern Tanzania to Kenya (Nairobi))

References

External links
Die Gross-Schmetterlinge der Erde 13: Die Afrikanischen Tagfalter. Plate XIII 66 f

Amblypodiini
Butterflies described in 1857